Thomas Pedersen may refer to:

 Thomas Pedersen (handballer) (born 1980), Danish handballer
 Thomas Pedersen (volleyball) (born 1993), Danish volleyball player
 Thomas Pedersen (singer), Norwegian singer and member of Cir.Cuz
 Thomas Garm Pedersen, Danish professor in physics and nanotechnology 
 Thomas Vilhelm Pedersen (1820–1859), Danish painter and illustrator